Galina Solodun (Russian: Галина Николаевна Солодун; born 26 January 1968) is a Russian politician serving as a senator from the Legislative Assembly of Bryansk Oblast since 27 September 2019.

Galina Solodun is under personal sanctions introduced by the European Union, the United Kingdom, the USA, Canada, Switzerland, Australia, Ukraine, New Zealand, for ratifying the decisions of the "Treaty of Friendship, Cooperation and Mutual Assistance between the Russian Federation and the Donetsk People's Republic and between the Russian Federation and the Luhansk People's Republic" and providing political and economic support for Russia's annexation of Ukrainian territories.

Biography

Galina Solodun was born on 26 January 1968 in Starodubsky District, Bryansk Oblast. From December 2015 to September 2019, she was the director of the Department of infrastructure and architecture of Bryansk Oblast. On 8 September 2019, Solodun was elected deputy of the Bryansk Oblast Duma of the 7th convocation. On 27 September 2019, she became the senator from the Legislative Assembly of Bryansk Oblast.

References

Living people
1968 births
United Russia politicians
21st-century Russian politicians
Members of the Federation Council of Russia (after 2000)